Matteo Minozzi (born 4 June 1996) is an Italian rugby union player, currently playing for Italian United Rugby Championship side Benetton. His usual position is as a Fullback. 

Minozzi previously played for Italian Pro14 team Zebre, from 2017 to 2019, and English team Wasps, from 2019 to 2022, in Premiership Rugby. 

From 2015 to 2016, Minozzi was named in the Italy Under 20 squad and in 2017 he parteciped with Emerging Italy in 2017 World Rugby Nations Cup.
On 10 January 2023, he was named in Italy A squad for a uncapped test against Romania A.

After 2018 Six Nations Championship, Minozzi was nominated for 2018 Six Nations Player of the Tournament after scoring 4 tries in 5 games  On 18 August 2019, he was named in the final 31-man squad for the 2019 Rugby World Cup.

International tries 
As of 19 November 2022

References

External links

1996 births
Living people
Italian rugby union players
Italy international rugby union players
Rugby union fullbacks
Rugby Calvisano players
Zebre Parma players
Wasps RFC players
Benetton Rugby players